Isenchubu Dam  is an earthfill dam located in Kagoshima Prefecture in Japan. The dam is used for irrigation and water supply. The catchment area of the dam is 7.1 km2. The dam impounds about 18  ha of land when full and can store 1220 thousand cubic meters of water. The construction of the dam was started on 1979 and completed in 1987.

See also
List of dams in Japan

References

Dams in Kagoshima Prefecture